New World barbets are near passerine birds from the family Capitonidae of the order Piciformes, which inhabit humid forests in Central and South America. They are closely related to the toucans.

The New World barbets are plump birds, with short necks and large heads. They get their name from the bristles that fringe their heavy bills. Most species are brightly coloured and live in tropical forest.

These barbets are mostly arboreal birds, which nest in tree holes dug by breeding pairs, laying two to four eggs. They eat fruit and insects. These birds do not migrate.

Ecology
While most New World barbet species inhabit lowland forest, some range into montane and temperate forests, as well.  Most are restricted to habitats containing trees with dead wood, which are used for nesting.

The diet of barbets is mixed, with fruit being the dominant part of the diet. Small prey items are also taken, especially when nesting. Barbets are capable of shifting their diet quickly in the face of changes in food availability. Numerous species of fruiting trees and bushes are visited; an individual barbet may feed on as many as 60 different species in its range. They also visit plantations and take cultivated fruit and vegetables. Fruit is eaten whole, and indigestible material such as seed pits is regurgitated later (often before singing). Regurgitation does not usually happen in the nest (as happens with toucans). Like their relatives, New World barbets are thought to be important agents in seed dispersal in tropical forests.

As well as taking fruit, they also take arthropod prey, gleaned from the branches and trunks of trees. A wide range of insects is taken, including ants, beetles, and moths. Scorpions and centipedes are also taken, and a few species take small vertebrates such as frogs.

Relationship with humans
New World barbets have little impact on humans. The loss of forest can have a deleterious effect on barbet species dependent on old growth, to the benefit of species that favour more disturbed or open habitat.

Three species of New World barbets are listed as threatened by the IUCN: The white-mantled barbet of Colombia is listed as endangered and the five-coloured barbet as vulnerable, the two having a relatively small range threatened by deforestation for the timber industry and to create space for agriculture (including coca and marijuana) and livestock, and mining. The quite recently discovered scarlet-banded barbet of Peru is considered vulnerable due to its small population size (estimated at under 1000 birds), although its remote habitat is not immediately threatened.

Systematics, taxonomy, and evolution
Fossil New World barbets have been found dating from the Miocene in Florida. The closest relatives of the barbets are the toucans, and these two families are also closely related to the honeyguides and woodpeckers (with which they form the order Piciformes).

Formerly, the barbets have been treated as one family. This has turned out to be paraphyletic, though, with regard to toucans; thus, only the New World true barbets are retained in the Capitonidae. The African barbets (Lybiidae) and the Asian barbets (Megalaimidae), as well as the two toucan-barbets from the Americas (Semnornithidae) are currently split from this family. Alternatively, the toucans, which evolved from a common ancestor shared with the American barbets, might be included in the traditional all-encompassing barbet family. As they have evolved characteristics that are unique to themselves, they are usually treated separately, thus the barbets are split up according to the four lineages.

Species

FAMILY: CAPITONIDAE
 Genus Capitonides  (Early – Middle Miocene of Europe) (fossil)
 Genus: Capito Scarlet-crowned barbet, Capito aurovirens
 Scarlet-banded barbet, Capito wallacei
 Spot-crowned barbet, Capito maculicoronatus
 Orange-fronted barbet, Capito squamatus
 White-mantled barbet, Capito hypoleucus
 Black-girdled barbet, Capito dayi
 Five-colored barbet, Capito quinticolor
 Black-spotted barbet, Capito niger
 Gilded barbet, Capito auratus
 Brown-chested barbet, Capito brunneipectus
 Sira barbet, Capito fitzpatricki
 Genus: Eubucco' Lemon-throated barbet, Eubucco richardsoni Red-headed barbet, Eubucco bourcierii Scarlet-hooded barbet, Eubucco tucinkae Versicolored barbet, Eubucco versicolor''

References

External links

Barbet videos on the Internet Bird Collection
Don Roberson's Bird Families of the World

 
Bird families

Higher-level bird taxa restricted to the Neotropics
Taxa named by Charles Lucien Bonaparte